Ker Place, sometimes spelled Kerr Place, is a historic home located at Onancock, Accomack County, Virginia. It was built in 1799, and is a two-story, five-bay rectangular Federal-style dwelling with a central projecting pedimented pavilion on both the front and rear elevations.  It has a cross-gable roof and a two-story wing which originally was a -story kitchen connected to the house by a hyphen.  In 1960, the house and two acres of land were acquired by, and made the headquarters of the Eastern Shore of Virginia Historical Society, which operates it as an early 19th-century historic house museum.

The first owner was John Shepherd Ker, a native of Accomack County, Virginia, son of Edward Ker, a native of Cessford, Scotland and Margaret Shepherd, from Northampton County, Virginia. It was added to the National Register of Historic Places in 1970.  It is located in the Onancock Historic District.

Gallery

References

External links
Ker Place — Shore History website
Kerr Place, Crockett Avenue & Market Street, Onancock, Accomack County, VA: 2 photos at Historic American Buildings Survey

Historic American Buildings Survey in Virginia
Houses on the National Register of Historic Places in Virginia
Federal architecture in Virginia
Houses completed in 1799
National Register of Historic Places in Accomack County, Virginia
Individually listed contributing properties to historic districts on the National Register in Virginia
Houses in Accomack County, Virginia
Museums in Accomack County, Virginia
Historic house museums in Virginia
1799 establishments in Virginia